The Coloane A Power Station (CCA) is a low-speed diesel-fired power station in Coloane, Macau, China. With an installed capacity of 271.4 MW, it is the largest power station in Macau.

History
The power station was commissioned on 28 November 1978.

Road access
To ease the access leading to the power station, the Government of Macau approved the new construction of access road in 2009. The road was completed a year later and was inaugurated on 16 September 2010. The new gate is expected to make things more convenient for staffs, suppliers and visitors. The road was constructed for the lay down area for the underground high voltage cable and vehicular access at the initial stage after Coloane B Power Station was completed.

2015 blast
On 26 April 2015 at 10:30 a.m., there was a blast at the power station on its G08 generation unit, causing injury to one of its personnel who was carrying out periodic maintenance.

Generation
The power station installed capacity makes up 58% of Macau's total installed capacity. In 2012, it generated 98% of total electricity production in Macau.

See also
 CEM (Macau)
 Electricity sector in Macau
 List of power stations in Macau

References

1978 establishments in Macau
Coloane
Energy infrastructure completed in 1978
Fossil fuel power stations in China
Power stations in Macau